Beaumont is a small town in inland Otago, in the South Island of New Zealand. It is located on the Clutha River / Mata-Au six kilometres southeast of Raes Junction, between Roxburgh and Balclutha. Beaumont is connected to Milton and Roxburgh by State Highway 8.

Beaumont was named for Beaumont Burn, probably about 1857.

For eleven years, Beaumont served as the terminus of a branch line railway that ran from a junction with the Main South Line at Milton.  The railway reached Beaumont in 1914; an extension to Millers Flat was opened in 1925. The line was ultimately reached Roxburgh as the Roxburgh Branch, operating until 1968.  Relics of the railway still remain, including a stock yard and a bridge over the Beaumont River.

References

Populated places in Otago
1857 establishments in New Zealand